Johann (Kaspar) Benedikt Beckenkamp (1747–1828) was a German painter.

Life
Beckenkamp was born in 1747 in the valley of Ehrenbreitstein, near Koblenz. He studied under his father Lorenz Beckenkamp and Jan Zick, at Koblenz. At first he devoted himself to painting landscapes, after C. G. Schütz; but later changed to portraiture. He settled at Cologne, and successfully imitated  the style of painting of the old German masters.

Several portraits by Beckenkamp are in the Wallraf Museum, Cologne. For the church of St Maria Lyskirchen in Cologne, he painted a copy of a triptych with a central panel of the Pietà by Joos van Cleve, the original of which (now in the Städelsches Kunstinstitut in Frankfurt) had been sold a few years before.

He died in Cologne in 1828.

See also
 List of German painters

Notes

References

External links
 Biography at the History Portal of Landschaftverband Rheinland (in German language)
 Biography at the Portal of EPOCHE NAPOLEON (in German language)

18th-century German painters
18th-century German male artists
German male painters
19th-century German painters
1747 births
1828 deaths
Artists from Koblenz
19th-century German male artists